The Porticus Octavia (Octavian Portico) was a portico in ancient Rome, built by Gnaeus Octavius in 168 BC to commemorate a naval victory over Perseus of Macedonia. It stood between the Theatre of Pompey and the Circus Flaminius. Pliny describes it as a double portico with bronze Corinthian capitals, for which it was also called the Porticus Corinthia. It may have been the earliest use of this architectural order in Rome, and is possibly to be identified with remains in the Via S. Nicola ai Cesarini, represented in the Severan Marble Plan (frg. 140). Velleius Paterculus called it multo amoenissima, or "by far the loveliest" of the porticoes, but has left no traces.

In 33 BC, Octavian (the future Augustus) recovered the military standards lost by Gabinius to the Illyrians, and displayed them at the Porticus Octavia, which he rebuilt to commemorate the conquest of Dalmatia.

See also
List of ancient monuments in Rome

References

External links
Platner and Ashby

Buildings and structures completed in the 2nd century BC
Ancient Roman buildings and structures in Rome